Saint-Mury-Monteymond is a commune in the Isère department in the region Auvergne-Rhône-Alpes of France.

History 
In 1882, Aristide Bergès constructed a 1200 hp turbine in the neighbouring hamlet of La Gorge, at the foot of the Peak of Belledonne.

Due to the steepness of the slope to the Lac Blanc, source of the river Vors, the first Penstocks were constructed.
Because of the work of Aristide Bergès, Saint-Mury-Monteymond became the first village in France illuminated by electrical power.

Geography 

Neighbouring communes are:
 Sainte-Agnès,
 La Combe-de-Lancey,
 Laval, 
 Villard-Bonnot, 
 Saint-Jean-le-Vieux.

Population

Sights
 Ancient millhouse

See also 
 List of Communes of the Isère Department

References

External links

 Official site

Communes of Isère
Isère communes articles needing translation from French Wikipedia